Marine molluscs of Australia are a part of the molluscan fauna of Australia.

Marine molluscs include saltwater snails, clams and other classes of Mollusca.

Aplacophora

Polyplacophora

Gastropoda 

 Tonna tankervillii (Hanley, 1860)

Bivalvia

Scaphopoda

Cephalopoda

See also
 List of molluscs of the Houtman Abrolhos
 List of non-marine molluscs of Australia
 List of marine molluscs of Indonesia
 List of marine molluscs of East Timor
 List of marine molluscs of Papua New Guinea
 List of marine molluscs of the Solomon Islands
 List of marine molluscs of Vanuatu
 List of marine molluscs of New Caledonia
 List of marine molluscs of New Zealand

References

External links
  Molluscs.otago: index

Marine
Molluscs
Australia, Marine
Australia